Angna Mountain is a mountain located on Baffin Island, Nunavut, Canada. It is associated with the Baffin Mountains which in turn form part of the Arctic Cordillera mountain system.

References

Arctic Cordillera
Mountains of Baffin Island
One-thousanders of Nunavut